Þórunn or Thorunn Magnúsdóttir may refer to:
Þórunn Elfa Magnúsdóttir (1910-1965), Icelandic writer
 Thorunn Magnúsdóttir (musician), member of the band Fields
 Þórunn Magnea Magnúsdóttir, actor in Jar City (film)